NehoX Game Panel was a web-based game server hosting control panel to help easily manage game servers.  NehoX is designed to simplify the process to deploy, automate, and maintain game servers and remote servers.  NehoX automates the installation process and the remote server installation process at the click of a button to enable administrators to add additional servers and fully control everything from the master server.

NehoX works on dedicated servers or virtual private servers and has been tested to work with CentOS with plans of working with Ubuntu and Debian.

System requirements 
NehoX is compatible with CentOS and in the future will work on Ubuntu and Debian. 

The following specifications are required:

Master Server
VPS or Dedicated Server
Linux - CentOS 5+
Root Access
Networking Access
NehoX Community or Pro License

Remote Server
VPS or Dedicated Server
Linux - CentOS 5+
Windows - Server 2003 or  2008
Root / Administrator Access
Networking Access
NehoX Pro License & Remote License

END OF LIFE 
As of December 2014, NeHoX's website is dead.

See also
 Installatron
 cPanel
 Domain Technologie Control
 Hosting Controller
 ISPConfig
 Kloxo
 Webmin
 InterWorx

References

External links 
 
 NehoX knowledge base
 Official forum
 WebHosting Talk
 GSPtalk
 Dedicated Servers

Web server management software